Cauchas albiantennella is a moth of the Adelidae family. It is found in France and Austria.

References

Moths described in 1943
Adelidae
Moths of Europe